This is a list of episodes of the British television sitcom Teachers, not to be confused with the American sitcom of the same name, which was loosely based on it.

Series overview

Episodes

Series 1 (2001)

Series 2 (2002)

Series 3 (2003)

Series 4 (2004)

Teachers (UK)